The 2022 CAF Women's Champions League WAFU Zone A Qualifiers is the 2nd edition of CAF Women's Champions League WAFU Zone A Qualifiers tournament organised by the WAFU for the women's clubs of association nations. This edition will be held from 17 to 21 August 2022 in Paynesville, Liberia. The winners of the tournament qualified for the 2022 CAF Women's Champions League final tournament .

Participating teams 
The following four teams contested in the qualifying tournament.

Venues

Match officials

Qualifying tournament 

Tiebreakers
Teams are ranked according to points (3 points for a win, 1 point for a draw, 0 points for a loss), and if tied on points, the following tiebreaking criteria are applied, in the order given, to determine the rankings.
Points in head-to-head matches among tied teams;
Goal difference in head-to-head matches among tied teams;
Goals scored in head-to-head matches among tied teams;
If more than two teams are tied, and after applying all head-to-head criteria above, a subset of teams are still tied, all head-to-head criteria above are reapplied exclusively to this subset of teams;
Goal difference in all group matches;
Goals scored in all group matches;
Penalty shoot-out if only two teams are tied and they met in the last round of the group;
Disciplinary points (yellow card = 1 point, red card as a result of two yellow cards = 3 points, direct red card = 3 points, yellow card followed by direct red card = 4 points);
Drawing of lots.

All times are  Liberia Standard Time   UTC -7  .

Awards and statistics

Goalscorers

References

External links 
2021 CAF Women's Champions League WAFU Zone A Qualifiers – cafonline.org

2022 CAF Women's Champions League
Women's Champions League
CAF
Women's sport in Liberia